Jodene Emerson (born August 3, 1972) is an American activist and Democratic politician.  She represents the city of Eau Claire in the Wisconsin State Assembly.

Early life, education, and family 
Emerson was born and raised in Eau Claire, Wisconsin, and graduated from Memorial High School. Emerson attended University of Wisconsin–River Falls for two years before starting a family. Emerson is married to Eau Claire Leader-Telegram reporter Julian Emerson and has two adult daughters. She has been a PTA president and Girl Scout troop leader.

Career 
Emerson has been an adjunct instructor on human trafficking topics at the University of Wisconsin–Eau Claire.

Emerson was a legal assistant in a law office and worked as the Director of Public Policy and Community Relations for Fierce Freedom, a nonprofit advocacy organization that worked to address human trafficking. Emerson has been an anti-trafficking advocate and author of a number of successful bipartisan pieces of legislation, including Senate Bill 344, Senate Bill 396, Senate Bill 618, Assembly Bill 16, Assembly Bill 186, Assembly Bill 435, and Act 367.

Emerson also developed a statewide program to train hotel workers to spot the signs of human trafficking and co-chaired the development of the statewide community response protocol on human trafficking. In 2015, Emerson was appointed to serve on Wisconsin's Anti Human Trafficking Task Force. Emerson has also been a member of the Wisconsin Anti-Trafficking Consortium and the Wisconsin Anti-Trafficking Advisory Council, serving as a frequent guest speaker and panelists at churches, schools and libraries across the midwest.

Wisconsin State Assembly
In March 2018, Emerson announced her run for District 91 of the Wisconsin State Assembly. The seat was held by Dana Wachs at the time, but was he was not seeking reelection due to his run for governor. Emerson was endorsed by EMILY's List, Fair Wisconsin, Citizen Action of Wisconsin, State Senator La Tonya Johnson, State Representative Jill Billings, former State Representative Kristen Dexter, and the Wisconsin Chapter of the National Organization for Women.

Emerson currently serves on the following committees in the Wisconsin State Assembly:

 Committee on Aging and Long-Term Care
 Committee on Colleges and Universities
 Committee on Criminal Justice and Public Safety
 Committee on Family Law
 Committee on International Affairs/Commerce

Electoral history

| colspan="6" style="text-align:center;background-color: #e9e9e9;"| Primary Election

| colspan="6" style="text-align:center;background-color: #e9e9e9;"| General Election

Notes

External links 
Representative Jodi Emerson - Official government website
Wisconsin Assembly Campaign website

Human trafficking in the United States
1973 births
Living people
Politicians from Eau Claire, Wisconsin
University of Wisconsin–River Falls alumni
21st-century American politicians
21st-century American women politicians
Women state legislators in Wisconsin
Democratic Party members of the Wisconsin State Assembly